This is a list of people who have made notable contributions to genetics. The growth and development of genetics represents the work of many people. This list of geneticists is therefore by no means complete. Contributors of great distinction to genetics are not yet on the list.



A  
Dagfinn Aarskog (1928–2014), Norwegian pediatrician and geneticist, described Aarskog–Scott syndrome
Jon Aase (born 1936), US dysmorphologist, described Aase syndrome, expert on fetal alcohol syndrome
John Abelson (born c. 1939), US biochemist, studies of machinery and mechanism of RNA splicing
Susan L. Ackerman, US neurogeneticist, genes controlling brain development and neuron survival
Jerry Adams (born 1940), US molecular biologist in Australia,  hematopoietic genetics and cancer
Bruce Alberts (born 1938), US biochemist, phage worker, studied DNA replication and cell division
William Allan (1881–1943), US country doctor, pioneered human genetics
C. David Allis (born 1951), US biologist with a fascination for chromatin
Robin Allshire (born 1960), UK-based Irish molecular biologist/geneticist and expert in formation of heterochromatin and centromeres
Carl-Henry Alström (1907–1993), Swedish psychiatrist, described genetic disease: Alström syndrome
Frederick Alt, American geneticist known for research on maintenance of genome stability in the cells of the mammalian immunological system
Russ Altman, US geneticist and bioengineer known for his work in pharmacogenomics
Sidney Altman (1939–2022), Canadian-US biophysicist who won Nobel Prize for catalytic functions of RNA
Cecil A. Alport (1880–1959), UK internist, identified Alport syndrome (hereditary nephritis and deafness)
David Altshuler (born c. 1965), US endocrinologist and geneticist, the genetics of type 2 diabetes
Bruce Ames (born 1928), US molecular geneticist, created Ames test to screen chemicals for mutagenicity
D. Bernard Amos (1923–2003), UK-US immunologist who studied the genetics of individuality
Edgar Anderson (1897–1969), eminent US botanical geneticist
E. G. ("Andy") Anderson (1924–1993), US Drosophila and maize geneticist
William French Anderson (born 1936), US worker in gene therapy
Corino Andrade (1906–2005), Portuguese neurologist and clinical geneticist
Tim Anson (1901–1968), US molecular biologist, proposed protein folding a reversible two-state reaction
Stylianos E. Antonarakis (born 1951), US-Greek medical geneticist, genotypic and phenotypic variation
Werner Arber (born 1929), Swiss microbiologist, Nobel Prize for discovery of restriction endonucleases
Enrico Arpaia (born 1949), Canadian molecular geneticist, Tay–Sachs disease, Zap70, Purine Nucleoside Phosphorylase
Michael Ashburner (born 1942), British Drosophila geneticist and polymath
William Astbury (1898–1961), UK molecular biologist, X-ray crystallography of proteins and DNA
Giuseppe Attardi (1923–2008), Italian-US molecular biologist, genetics of human mitochondrial function
Charlotte Auerbach (1899–1994), German-born British pioneer in  mutagenesis
Oswald Avery (1877–1955), Canadian-born US co-discoverer that DNA is the genetic material
Richard Axel (born 1946), US physician-scientist, Nobel Prize for genetic analysis of olfactory system

B 
E. B. Babcock (1877–1954), US plant geneticist, pioneered genetic analysis of genus Crepis
Édouard-Gérard Balbiani (1823–1899), French embryologist who found chromosome puffs now called Balbiani rings
David Baltimore (born 1938), US biologist, Nobel Prize for the discovery of reverse transcriptase
 Guido Barbujani (born 1955), Italian population geneticist and evolutionary biologist
Cornelia Bargmann (born 1961), US molecular neurogeneticist studying the C. elegans brain
David P. Bartel (B.A. 1982), US geneticist, discovered many microRNAs regulating gene expression
William Bateson (1861–1926), British geneticist who coined the term "genetics"
E. Baur (1875–1933), German geneticist, botanist, discovered inheritance of plasmids
George Beadle (1903–1989), US Neurospora geneticist and  Nobel Prize-winner
Peter Emil Becker (1908–2000), German human geneticist, described Becker's muscular dystrophy
Jon Beckwith (born 1935), US microbiologist and geneticist, isolated first gene from a bacterial chromosome
Peter Beighton (born 1934), UK/South Africa medical geneticist
Julia Bell (1879–1979), English geneticist who documented inheritance of many diseases
John Belling (1866–1933), English cytogeneticist who developed staining technique for chromosomes
Baruj Benacerraf (1920–2011), Venezuelan-US immunologist who won Nobel Prize for human leukocyte antigen system
Kurt Benirschke (1924–2018), German-US pathologist, comparative cytogenetics, twinning in armadillos
Seymour Benzer  (1921–2007), US molecular biologist and pioneer of neurogenetics
Dorothea Bennett (1929–1990), US geneticist, Pioneer of developmental genetics
Paul Berg (1926–2023), US biochemist and Nobel Prize-winner for basic research on nucleic acids
J. D. Bernal (1901–1971), Irish physicist and pioneer X-ray crystallographer
James Birchler, Drosophila and Maize geneticists and cytogenticist.
J. Michael Bishop (born 1936), US microbial immunogeneticist, Nobel Prize-winner for oncogenes
Elizabeth Blackburn (born 1948), Australo-US biologist, Lasker Award and Nobel Prize for telomeres and telomerase
Günter Blobel (1936–2018), German-US biologist, Nobel Prize  for protein targeting (address tags on proteins)
David Blow (1931–2004), British biophysicist who helped develop X-ray crystallography of proteins
Baruch Blumberg (Barry Blumberg) (1925–2011), US physician and Nobel Prize-winner on hepatitis B
Julia Bodmer (1934–2001), British geneticist, key figure in discovery and definition of the HLA system
Walter Bodmer (born 1936), German-UK human population geneticist, immunogeneticist, cancer research
James Bonner (1910–1996), far-ranging US molecular biologist, into histones, chromatin, nucleic acids
David Botstein (born 1942), Swiss-born US molecular geneticist, brother of Leon Botstein
Theodor Boveri (1862–1915), German biologist and cytogeneticist
Peter Bowen (1932–1988), Canadian medical geneticist
Herb Boyer (born 1936), US, created transgenic bacteria inserting human insulin gene into E. coli
Paul D. Boyer (1918–2018), US biochemist and Nobel Prize-winner
Jean Brachet (1909–1998), Belgian biochemist, made key contributions to fathoming roles of RNA
Roscoe Brady (1923–2016), US physician-scientist at NIH, studies of genetic neurological metabolic disorders
Sydney Brenner (1927–2019), British molecular biologist and Nobel Prize-winner
Calvin Bridges (1889–1938), US geneticist, non-disjunction proof that chromosomes contain genes
R. A. Brink (1897–1984), Canadian-US plant geneticist and breeder, studied paramutation, transposons
Roy Britten (1919–2012) US molecular and evolutionary biologist, discovered and studied junk DNA
John Brookfield (born 1955), Drosophila population geneticist
Michael Stuart Brown (born 1941), US geneticist and Nobel Prize-winner on cholesterol metabolism
Manuel Buchwald (born 1940), Peruvian-born Canadian medical geneticist and molecular geneticist
Linda Buck (born 1947), US biologist, Nobel Prize for post-doc work (with Axel) cloning olfactory receptors
James Bull, US molecular biologist and phage worker, evolution of sex determining mechanisms
Luther Burbank (1849–1926), US botanist, horticulturist, pioneer in agricultural science
Macfarlane Burnet (1899–1985), Australian biologist, Nobel Prize for immunological tolerance
Cyril Burt (1883–1971), British educational psychologist, did debated mental and behavioral twin study

C 
John Cairns (1922–2018), UK physician-scientist, showed bacterial DNA one molecule with replicating fork
Allan Campbell (1929–2018), US microbiologist and geneticist, pioneering work on phage lambda
Howard Cann, US pediatrician and geneticist, human population genetics at Stanford and CEPH in Paris
Antonio Cao (1929–2012), Italian pediatrician and medical geneticist, expert on the thalassemias
Mario Capecchi (born 1937), Italian-born US molecular geneticist, co-invented the knockout mouse, Nobel Prize in Medicine, 2007
Elof Axel Carlson (born 1931), US geneticist and eminent historian of science
Rivka Carmi (born 1948), Israeli pediatrician, geneticist, President of Ben-Gurion University of the Negev
Adelaide Carpenter (born 1944), a geneticist known for her research on recombination nodule
Hampton L. Carson (1914–2004), US population geneticist, studied cytogenetics and evolution of Drosophila
Tom Caskey (born c. 1938), US internist, human geneticist and entrepreneur; biochemical diseases
Torbjörn Caspersson (1910–1997), Swedish cytogeneticist, revealed human chromosome banding
William B. Castle (1897–1990), US hematologist, work on hereditary spherocytosis, sickle cell anemia
William E. Castle (1867–1962), US geneticist, inspired T.H. Morgan, father of William B. Castle
David Catcheside (1907–1994), UK plant geneticist, expert on genetic recombination, active in Australia
Bruce Cattanach (1932–2020), UK mouse geneticist, X-inactivation and sex determination in mice
Luigi Luca Cavalli-Sforza (1922–2018), Italian population geneticist at Stanford University
Thomas Cech (born 1947), US biochemist who won Nobel Prize for catalytic functions of RNA
Aravinda Chakravarti (born 1954), Indian-born bioinformatician studying genetic factors in common diseases
Daniel Chamovitz (born 1963), discovered the COP9 Signalosome (CSN) complex
Jean-Pierre Changeux (born 1936), French molecular neurobiologist, studied allosteric proteins
Erwin Chargaff (1905–2002), Austrian-born US biochemist, Chargaff's rules led to the double helix
Brian Charlesworth (born 1945), British evolutionary biologist, husband of Deborah Charlesworth
Deborah Charlesworth (born 1943), British evolutionary biologist, wife of Brian Charlesworth
Martha Chase (1927–2003), US biologist, with Hersey proved genetic material is DNA, not protein
Sergei Chetverikov (1880–1959), Russian population geneticist
Barton Childs (1916–2010), US pediatrician, biochemical geneticist, philosopher of medical genetics
George M. Church (born 1954), US molecular geneticist, did first direct genomic sequencing with Gilbert
Aaron Ciechanover (born 1947), Israeli biologist, won Nobel Prize for ubiquitin-mediated protein degradation
Bryan Clarke (1932–2014), British population geneticist, studied apostatic selection and molecular evolution
Cyril Clarke (1907–2000), British medical geneticist, discovered how to prevent Rh disease in newborns
Jens Clausen (1891–1969), Danish-US botanist, geneticist, and ecologist
Stanley Cohen (1922–2020), US neurobiologist, Nobel Prize for cell growth factors
Francis Collins (born 1950), US medical geneticist, gene cloner, director of Human Genome Institute
James J. Collins (born 1965), US bioengineer, pioneered synthetic biology and systems biology
Robert Corey (1897–1971), US biochemist, α-helix, β-sheet and atomic models for proteins
Carl Correns (1864–1933), German botanist and geneticist, one of the re-discoverers of Mendel in 1900
Lewis L. Coriell (1911–2001), US pioneer in culturing human cells
Diane W. Cox, Canadian medical geneticist and expert on Wilson's disease
Harriet Creighton (1909–2004), US botanist who with McClintock first saw chromosomal crossover
Francis Crick (1916–2004), English molecular biologist, neuroscientist, co-discoverer of the double helix
James F. Crow (1916–2012), US population geneticist and renowned teacher of genetics
Lucien Cuénot (1866–1951), French biologist, proved Mendel's rules apply to animals as well as plants
A. Jamie Cuticchia (born 1966), US geneticist, into human genome informatics

D 
Mark Daly, American geneticist who identified genes associated with Crohn's disease, inflammatory bowel disease, autism and schizophrenia
David M. Danks (1931–2003), Australian pediatrician and medical geneticist, expert on Menkes disease
C. D. Darlington (1903–1981), British biologist and geneticist, elucidated chromosomal crossover
Charles Darwin (1809–1882), English naturalist and author of On the Origin of Species
Kay Davies (born 1951), English geneticist, expert on muscular dystrophy
Jean Dausset (1916–2009), French immunogeneticist and Nobel Prize-winner for the HLA system
Martin Dawson (1896–1945), Canadian-US researcher, confirmed and named genetic transformation
Margaret Dayhoff (1925–1983), US pioneer in bioinformatics of protein sequences and evolution
Albert de la Chapelle (1933–2020), eminent Finnish medical geneticist, genetic predisposition to cancer
Max Delbrück (1906–1981), German-US scientist, Nobel Prize for genetic structure of viruses
Charles DeLisi (born 1941), US biophysicist, led the initiative that planned and launched the Human Genome Project
Emmanouil Dermitzakis (born 1972), Greek human geneticist known for research on the importance of non-coding DNA in evolution and disease risk
Félix d'Herelle (1873–1949), Canadian-French microbiologist, discovered phages, invented phage therapy
Hugo de Vries (1848–1935), Dutch botanist and one of the re-discoverers of Mendel's laws in 1900
Carrie Derrick (1862–1941), Canadian geneticist, Canada's first female professor
M. Demerec (1895–1966), Croatian-US geneticist, directed Cold Spring Harbor Laboratory
Theodosius Dobzhansky (1900–1975), noted Ukrainian-US geneticist and evolutionary biologist
John Doebley, (born 1952), US geneticist, studies genes that drive  development and evolution of plants
Peter Doherty (born 1940), Australian, won Nobel Prize for immune recognition of antigens
Albert Dorfman (1916–1982), US biochemical geneticist, discovered cause of Hurler's syndrome
Gabriel Dover (1937–2018), British evolutionary geneticist
Dennis Drayna, (born 1952), American human geneticist most notable for discovering genetic causes of stuttering
NT Dubinin (1907–1998), Russian biologist and geneticist
Bernard Dutrillaux (born 1940), French cytogeneticist, chromosome banding, comparative cytogenetics
Christian de Duve (1917–2013), Belgian cytologist, Nobel Prize for cell organelles (peroxisomes, lysosomes)

E 
Richard H. Ebright (born 1959), US bacterial geneticist, molecular mechanisms of transcription and transcriptional regulation
A.W.F. Edwards (born 1935), British statistician, geneticist, developed methods of phylogenetic analysis
John Edwards (1928–2007), British medical geneticist and cytogeneticist who first described trisomy 18
Hans Eiberg (born 1945), Danish geneticist, discovered the mutation causing blue eyes
Eugene "Gene" J. Eisen (born 1938), US geneticist, experimental validation of the theory of genetic correlations; first to conduct a long-term selection experiment with transgenic mice
Jeff Ellis (born 1953), Australian scientist
R. A. Emerson (1873–1947), US plant geneticist, the main pioneer of corn genetics
Sterling Emerson (1900–1988), US, biochemical genetics, recombination, son of R. A. Emerson
Alan Emery (born 1928), British neuromuscular geneticist, Emery–Dreifuss muscular dystrophy
Boris Ephrussi (1901–1979), Russian-born French geneticist, created way to transplant chromosomes
Robert C. Elston (born 1932), British-born American biostatistical genetics and genetic epidemiologist
Charlie Epstein (1933–2011), US medical geneticist, editor, developed mouse model for Down syndrome, wounded by the Unabomber
Eleazar Eskin, professor and Chair of the Department of Computational Medicine, University of California, Los Angeles
Herbert McLean Evans (1882–1971), US anatomist, reported in 1918 humans had 48 chromosomes
Martin Evans (born 1941), British scientist, discovered embryonic stem cells and developed knockout mouse
Cassandra Extavour, Canadian American geneticist and Professor of Organismic and Evolutionary Biology at Harvard University
Warren Ewens (born 1937), Australian-US mathematical population geneticist, Ewens's sampling formula

F 
Alexander Cyril Fabergé (1912–1988), Russian-born Anglo-American geneticist, grandson of Carl Fabergé
Arturo Falaschi (1933–2010), Italian geneticist, researched the origin of DNA replication
D. S. Falconer (1913–2004), Scottish quantitative geneticist, wrote textbook to the subject
Darrel R. Falk (born 1946), US biologist
Stanley Falkow (1934–2018), US microbial geneticist,  molecular mechanisms of bacterial pathogenesis
Harold Falls (1909–2006), US ophthalmologic geneticist, helped found first genetics clinic in US
William C. Farabee (1865–1925), US anthropologist, brachydactyly is evidence of Mendelism in humans
Nina Fedoroff (born c. 1945), US plant geneticist, cloning of transposable elements, plant stress response
Malcolm Ferguson-Smith (born 1931) UK cytogeneticist, Klinefelter syndrome, chromosome flow cytometry
Philip J. Fialkow (1934–1996), US internist, educator, research in medical genetics and cancer genetics
Giorgio Filippi (1935–1996), Italian medical geneticist, researched diseases linked to X chromosome
J. R. S. Fincham (1926–2005), UK microbial (Neurospora) and biochemical geneticist
Gerald Fink (born 1941), US molecular geneticist, preeminent figure in the field of yeast genetics
Hilary Finucane, computational biologist with research focus on combining genetic data and molecular data to characterize mechanisms of disease
Andrew Fire (born 1959), US geneticist, Nobel Prize with Mello for discovery of RNA interference
Robert L. Fischer (born 1950), US geneticist, contributed to the understanding of genomic imprinting and epigenetics
R. A. Fisher (1890–1962), British stellar statistician, evolutionary biologist, and geneticist
Ed Fischer (1920–2021), Swiss-US biochemist, Nobel Prize for phosphorylation as switch activating proteins
Eugen Fischer (1874–1967), German physician, anthropologist, eugenicist, influenced Nazi racial hygiene
Ivar Asbjørn Følling (1888–1973), Norwegian biochemist and physician who discovered phenylketonuria (PKU)
E. B. Ford (1901–1988), British ecological geneticist, specializing in butterflies and moths
Charles Ford (1912–1999), British pioneer in the golden age of mammalian cytogenetics
Ruth Fowler Edwards (1930–2013), British geneticist who helped develop controlled ovulation induction in the mouse
Heinz Fraenkel-Conrat (1910–1999), German-born US biochemist who studied tobacco mosaic virus
Rosalind Franklin (1920–1958), British crystallographer whose data led to discovery of double helix
Clarke Fraser (1920–2014), Canada's first medical geneticist, student of congenital malformations
Elaine Fuchs (born c. 1951), US cell biologist, molecular mechanisms of skin diseases, reverse genetics
Walter Fuhrmann (1924–1995), German medical geneticist, at Giessen University
Douglas J. Futuyma (born 1942), US evolutionary and ecological biologist

G
Michael T. Gabbett (born 1974), Australian medical geneticist and academic, known for describing Temple–Baraitser syndrome and sesquizygotic twinning
Fred Gage (born 1950), US neuroscientist, studies of neurogenesis and neuroplasticity of the adult brain
Joseph G. Gall (born 1928), distinguished US cell biologist, chromosomes, created in situ hybridization
André Gallais, French specialist in quantitative genetics and breeding methods theory
Francis Galton (1822–1911), British geneticist, eugenicist, statistician
George Gamow (1904–1968), Ukrainian-born American polymath, proposed genetic code concept
Eldon J. Gardner (1909–1989), US professor of genetics in Utah, described Gardner's syndrome
Alan Garen (1926–2022), US, early molecular geneticist, nonsense triplets terminating transcription
Archibald Garrod (1857–1936), English physician, pioneered inborn errors, founded biochemical genetics
Stan Gartler (born 1923), US human geneticist, G6PD as X-linked marker, clonality of cancer, HeLa cells contaminating cell lines
Lihadh Al-Gazali (born 1948), Iraqi geneticist, research on congenital disorders in the United Arab Emirates
Luigi Gedda (1902–2000), Italian geneticist best known for his fascination with twin studies
Walter Gehring (1939–2014), Swiss, developmental genetics of Drosophila, discovered homeobox
Park S. Gerald (1921–1993), US medical geneticist, research on hemoglobins and chromosomes
James L. German, US medical geneticist and cytogeneticist, pioneer on Bloom syndrome
Walter Gilbert (born 1932), US biochemist and molecular biologist, Nobel Prize-winner, entrepreneur
H. Bentley Glass (1906–2005), US geneticist, provocative science theorizer, writer, science policy maker
Salome Gluecksohn-Waelsch (1907–2007), German-born US co-founder of developmental genetics
Richard Goldschmidt (1878–1958), German-American, integrated genetics, development, and evolution
 Joseph L. Goldstein (born 1940), US medical geneticist, Nobel Prize-winner on cholesterol
Richard M. Goodman (1932–1989), US-Israeli clinical geneticist, pioneered Jewish genetic diseases
Robert J. Gorlin (1923–2006), US oral pathologist, clinical geneticist, craniofacial syndrome expert
Irving I. Gottesman (1930–2016), US behavioral geneticist, used twin studies to analyze schizophrenia
Carol W. Greider (born 1961), US molecular biologist, Lasker Award and Nobel Prize for telomeres and telomerase
Frederick Griffith (1879–1941), British medical officer who found transforming principle now called DNA
Lyn R. Griffiths, distinguished Australian molecular geneticist known for her work in neurogenetics
Clifford Grobstein (1916–1998), US scientist, bridged classical embryology and developmental biology
Jean de Grouchy (1926–2003), French pioneer of clinical cytogenetics and karyotype–phenotype correlation
Hans Grüneberg (1907–1982), British mouse geneticist and blood cell biologist
Pierre-Henri Gouyon (born 1953), French biologist specializing in genetics and bioethics
Elliot S. Goldstein, US geneticist at Arizona State University
Alexander Gusev (scientist), human geneticist with a focus on oncogenomics

H 
Ernst Hadorn (1902–1976), Swiss pioneer in developmental genetics, mentor of Walter Gehring
JBS Haldane (1892–1964), brilliant British human geneticist and co-founder of population genetics
Ben Hall, US geneticist, DNA:RNA hybridization, yeast production of genetically engineered proteins
Judy Hall (born 1939), dual American and Canadian charismatic clinical geneticist and dysmorphologist
Dean Hamer (born 1951) US geneticist, postulated gay gene and God gene for religious experience
John Hamerton (1929–2006), UK-Canadian cytogeneticist, prenatal diagnostician, bioethicist
W. D. Hamilton (1936–2000), British evolutionary biologist and eminent evolutionary theorist
Phil Hanawalt (born 1931), US geneticist, discovered DNA repair replication
Anita Harding (1952–1995), UK neurologist, first mitochondrial DNA mutation in disease
G. H. Hardy (1877–1947), British mathematician, formulated basic law of population genetics
Henry Harpending (1944–2016), US anthropologist and human population geneticist
Harry Harris (1919–1994), British biochemical geneticist par excellence
Henry Harris (1925–2014), Australian-born  cell biologist, work on cancer and human genetics
Lee Hartwell (born 1939), US yeast geneticist, Nobel Prize, "start" gene and checkpoints in the cell cycle
Mogens Hauge (1922–1988), Danish medical geneticist and twin researcher
Donald Hawthorne (1926–2003), US, major contributor to yeast genetics, centromere-linked gene maps
William Hayes (1918–1994), Australian physician, microbiologist and geneticist, bacterial conjugation
Robert Haynes (1931–1998), Canadian geneticist and biophysicist, work on DNA repair and mutagenesis
Frederick Hecht (born 1930), US clinical geneticist, cytogeneticist, coined term fragile site
Michael Heidelberger (1888–1991) US pioneer of modern immunology, won two Lasker Awards
Martin Heisenberg (born 1940), German geneticist, neurobiologist, genetic study of brain of Drosophila
Charles Roy Henderson, (1911–1989), US animal geneticist, basis for genetic evaluation of livestock, developed statistical methods used in animal breeding
Al Hershey (1908–1997), US bacterial geneticist, Nobel Prize largely for Hershey–Chase experiment
Ira Herskowitz (1946–2003), US phage and yeast geneticist, genetic regulatory circuits and mechanisms
Len Herzenberg (1931–2013), US human geneticist, immunologist, cell biologist and cell sorter
Avram Hershko (born 1937), Israeli biologist, Nobel Prize for ubiquitin-mediated protein degradation
Kurt Hirschhorn (born 1926), Viennese-born American pediatrician, medical geneticist, cytogeneticist; described Wolf–Hirschhorn syndrome
Mahlon Hoagland (1921–2009), US physician and biochemist, co-discovered tRNA with Paul Zamecnik
Dorothy Hodgkin (1910–1994), British founder of protein crystallography and Nobel Prize winner
Robert W. Holley (1922–1993), US biochemist, structure of transfer RNA, Nobel Prize
Leroy Hood (born 1938), US molecular biotechnologist, created DNA and protein sequencers and synthesizers
Norman Horowitz (1915–2005), US geneticist, one gene-one enzyme, chemical evolution, space biology
H. Robert Horvitz (born 1947), US cell biologist, Nobel Prize for programmed cell death
David E. Housman, US molecular biologist, genetic basis of trinucleotide repeat diseases and cancer
Martha M. Howe, US phage geneticist, notable contributions to the study of phage Mu
T. C. Hsu (1917–2003), distinguished Chinese-American cell biologist, geneticist, cytogeneticist
Thomas J. Hudson (born 1961), Canadian genome scientist, maps of human and mouse genomes
David Hungerford (1927–1993), US co-discoverer of Philadelphia chromosome in CML
Tim Hunt (born 1943), UK biochemist, Nobel Prize for discovery of cyclins in cell cycle control
Charles Leonard Huskins (1897–1953), English-born Canadian cytogeneticist at McGill University and University of Wisconsin–Madison

I 

Harvey Itano (1920–2010), American biochemist and pioneer in the study of sickle cell disease

J 
François Jacob (1920–2013), French biologist, won Nobel Prize for bacterial gene control
Patricia A. Jacobs (born 1934), Scottish human geneticist and cytogeneticist
Albert Jacquard (1925–2013), French geneticist, essayist, humanist, activist
Rudolf Jaenisch (born 1942), German cell biologist, created transgenic mice, leader in therapeutic cloning
Richard Jefferson (born 1956), US molecular plant biologist in Australia, reporter gene system GUS
Alec Jeffreys (born 1950), British geneticist, developed DNA fingerprinting and DNA profiling techniques
Niels Kaj Jerne (1911–1994), Danish, greatest theoretician in modern immunology, Nobel Prize
Elizabeth W. Jones (1939–2008) US yeast geneticist, first to complete the University of Washington graduate genetics program
Wilhelm Johannsen (1857–1927), Danish botanist who in 1909 coined the word "gene"
Jonathan D. G. Jones (born 1954), British plant molecular biologist
Steve Jones (born 1944), British evolutionary geneticist and malacologist
Christian Jung (born 1956), German plant geneticist and molecular biologist

K 
Dronamraju Krishna Rao (1937–2020), Indian born geneticist, founder of Foundation of Genetic Research
Elvin Kabat (1914–2000) US immunochemist, a founder of modern immunology, antibody-combining sites
Henrik Kacser (1918–1995), Romanian-born UK biochemist and geneticist, worked on metabolic control
Axel Kahn (1944–2021), French scientist and geneticist, known for work on genetically modified plants
Patricia Kailis (1933–2020), Australian geneticist
Franz Josef Kallmann (1897–1965), German-US psychiatrist, pioneer in genetics of psychiatric diseases
Wojciech Karlowski (born 1966), Polish molecular biologist specializing in molecular genetics and genomics
Gopinath Kartha (1927–1984), Indian biophysicist, co-discovered triple-helix structure of collagen
Berwind P. Kaufmann (1897–1975), US botanist, did research in basic plant and animal cytogenetics
John Kendrew (1917–1997), UK crystallographer, won Nobel Prize for structure of myoglobin
Cynthia Kenyon (born c. 1955), US molecular biologist, genetics of aging in the worm C. elegans
Warwick Estevam Kerr (1922–2018) Brazilian expert in the genetics and sex determination of bees
Bernard Kettlewell (1907–1979), UK physician, lepidopterist, ecological geneticist, peppered moth
Seymour Kety (1915–2000), US neuroscientist, essential involvement of genetic factors in schizophrenia
Gobind Khorana (1922–2011), Indian-US molecular biologist, synthesized nucleic acids, Nobel Prize
Motoo Kimura (1924–1994), influential Japanese mathematical biologist in theoretical population genetics
Mary-Claire King (born 1946), US human geneticist and social activist, identified breast cancer genes
David Klein, (1908–1993), Swiss ophthalmologist and human geneticist
Harold Klinger (1929–2004), US pioneer on human chromosomes, founded journal Cytogenetics
Aaron Klug (1926–2018), Lithuania/South Africa/UK, Nobel Prize for developing electron crystallography
Al Knudson (1922–2016), US pediatric oncologist, geneticist, formulated two hit hypothesis of cancer
Georges J. F. Köhler (1946–1995), German, Nobel Prize for hybridomas making monoclonal antibodies
Arthur Kornberg (1918–2007), US biochemist, Nobel Prize on DNA synthesis, father of Roger Kornberg
Roger Kornberg (born 1947), US biologist, Nobel Prize on eukaryotic transcription
Hans Kornberg (1928–2019), German-UK biologist, studies of carbohydrate transport
Ed Krebs (1918–2009), US biochemist, Nobel Prize for phosphorylation as switch activating proteins
Martin Kreitman, US geneticist known for the McDonald–Kreitman test that is used to infer adaptive evolution in population genetic studies
Eric Kremer, US molecular biologist, found trinucleotide repeat in fragile X, research now in gene therapy
Shrawan Kumar, Indian-American geneticist, gene mapping and cloning, discovered Branchio-Oto-Renal syndrome and ADPKD2 genes
Henry Kunkel (1916–1983), US immunologist, created starch gel electrophoresis to separate proteins

L 
Bruce Lahn (born 1969), Chinese-born geneticist specializing in evolutionary changes of the human brain
Jean-Baptiste Lamarck (1744–1829), French naturalist, evolutionist, "inheritance of acquired traits"
Eric Lander (born 1957), US molecular geneticist, major contributor to Human Genome Project
Karl Landsteiner (1868–1943), Austrian-American pathologist, won Nobel Prize for blood group discoveries
André Langaney, French evolutionary geneticist
Derald Langham (1913–1991), US agricultural geneticist, the "father of sesame"
Sam Latt (1938–1988), US pioneer in molecular cytogenetics, fluorescent DNA chromosome probes
Philip Leder (1934–2020), US geneticist, method to decode genetic code, transgenic animals to study cancer
Esther Lederberg (1922–2006), US microbiologist and bacterial genetics pioneer
Joshua Lederberg (1925–2008), US molecular biologist, Nobel Prize, headed Rockefeller University
Jérôme Lejeune (1926–1994), French pediatrician, geneticist, discovered trisomy 21 in Down syndrome
Richard Lenski (born 1956), US biologist and phage worker, did long-term E. coli evolution experiment
Fritz Lenz (1887–1976), German geneticist and eugenicist, ideas influenced Nazi racial hygiene policies
Widukind Lenz (1919–1995), eminent German medical geneticist who recognized thalidomide syndrome
Leonard Lerman (1925–2012), US molecular biologist, phage worker, mentor of Nobel Prize-winner Sidney Altman
I. Michael Lerner (1910–1977), Russian-US contributor to population, quantitative and evolutionary genetics
Albert Levan (1905–1998), Swedist geneticist, co-authored report that humans have 46 chromosomes
Cyrus Levinthal (1922–1990), US molecular geneticist, DNA replication, mRNA, molecular graphics
Edward B. Lewis (1918–2004), US founder of developmental genetics and Nobel Prize-winner
Richard Lewontin (1929–2021), US evolutionary biologist, geneticist and social commentator
C. C. Li (1912–2003), eminent Chinese American population geneticist and human geneticist
Wen-Hsiung Li (born 1942), Taiwanese-American, molecular evolution, population genetics, genomics
David Linder (1923–1999), US pathologist and geneticist, used G6PD as X-linked clonal tumor marker
Susan Lindquist (1949–2016), US molecular biologist studying effects of protein folding and heat-shock proteins
Jan Lindsten (born 1935), eminent Swedish medical geneticist, secretary general of the Nobel Assembly
Fritz Lipmann (1899–1986), German-American biochemist, Nobel Prize for co-discovery of coenzyme A
C. C. Little (1888–1971), US pioneer mouse geneticist, founded Jackson Laboratory in Bar Harbor, Maine
Richard Losick (born 1943), US molecular biologist, RNA polymerase, gene transcription, bacterial development
Herbert Lubs (born c. 1928), US internist, medical geneticist, described "marker X" (fragile X chromosome)
Salvador Luria (1912–1991), Italian-American molecular biologist, Nobel Prize for bacteriophage genetics
Jay Lush (1896–1982), US animal geneticist who pioneered modern scientific animal breeding
Michael Lynch  (born 1951), US quantitative geneticist studying evolution, population genetics, and genomics
Mary F. Lyon (1925–2014), English mouse geneticist, noted X-inactivation and proposed Lyon hypothesis
David T. Lykken (1928–2006), US psychologist and behavioral geneticist known for twin studies
Trofim Lysenko (1898–1976), Soviet scientist, led vicious political campaign against genetics in USSR

M 
Ellen Magenis (1925–2014), US medical geneticist and cytogeneticist, Smith–Magenis syndrome
Phyllis McAlpine (1941–1998), Canadian human geneticist and gene mapper
Maclyn McCarty (1911–2005), US co-discoverer that DNA is the genetic material
Barbara McClintock (1902–1992), US cytogeneticist, Nobel Prize for genetic transposition
William McGinnis, US molecular geneticist, found homeobox (Hox) genes responsible for basic body plan
Victor A. McKusick (1921–2008), US internist and clinical geneticist, organized human genetic knowledge
Colin MacLeod (1909–1972), Canadian-American co-discoverer that DNA is the genetic material
Tak Wah Mak (born 1946), Chinese-Canadian molecular biologist, co-discovered human T cell receptor genes
Gustave Malécot (1911–1998), French mathematician who influenced population genetics
Tom Maniatis (born 1943), US molecular biologist, gene cloning, regulation of gene expression
Clement Markert (1917–1999), eminent US biologist, discovered isozymes
Joan Marks, US social worker, principal architect of the profession of genetic counselor
Marco Marra (born 1966), Canadian scientist
Richard E. Marshall (1933–2016), US paediatrician, Greig's syndrome I, Marshall–Smith syndrome
John Maynard Smith (1920–2004), British evolutionary biologist and population geneticist
Ernst Mayr (1904–2005), leading German-born American evolutionary biologist
Peter Medawar (1915–1987), Brazilian-born English scientist, Nobel Prize for immunological tolerance
Craig C. Mello (born 1960), US geneticist, Nobel Prize for discovery of RNA interference
Gregor Mendel (1822–1884), Bohemian monk who discovered laws of Mendelian inheritance
Carole Meredith, US geneticist who pioneered DNA typing to differentiate between grape varieties
Matthew Meselson (born 1930), US molecular geneticist, work on DNA replication, recombination, repair
Peter Michaelis (1900–1975), German plant geneticist, focused on cytoplasmic inheritance
Ivan Vladimirovich Michurin (1855–1935), Russian plant geneticist, scientific agricultural selection
Friedrich Miescher (1844–1895), Swiss biologist, found weak acid in white blood cells now called DNA
Margareta Mikkelsen (1923–2004), eminent German-born Danish human geneticist and cytogeneticist
Lois K. Miller (1945–1999), entomologist and molecular geneticist, studied insect viruses
O. J. Miller, US physician, human and mammalian genetics and chromosome structure and function
César Milstein (1927–2002), Argentine-UK, Nobel Prize for hybridomas making monoclonal antibodies
Aubrey Milunsky (born c. 1936), South African-US physician, medical geneticist, writer, prenatal diagnosis
Alfred Mirsky (1900–1974), US pioneer in molecular biology, hemoglobin structure, constancy of DNA
Felix Mitelman (born 1940), Swedish cancer geneticist and cytogeneticist, catalog of chromosomes in cancer
Jan Mohr (1921–2009), eminent Norwegian-Danish pioneer in human gene mapping
Jacques Monod (1910–1976), French molecular biologist, Nobel Prize-winner
Lilian Vaughan Morgan (1870–1952), wife of T. H. Morgan and a fine geneticist in her own right
T. H. Morgan (1866–1945), head of the "fly room," first geneticist to win the Nobel Prize
 Newton E. Morton (1929–2018), population geneticist and genetic epidemiologist
Arno Motulsky (1923–2018), German-US hematologist who influenced medical genetics and founded pharmacogenetics
Arthur Mourant (1904–1994), British hematologist, first to examine worldwide blood group distributions
H. J. Muller (1890–1967), US Drosophila geneticist, Nobel Prize for producing mutations by X-rays
Hans J. Müller-Eberhard (1927–1998), German-US immunogeneticist, immunoglobulins and complement
Kary Mullis (1944–2019), US biochemist, Nobel Prize for the polymerase chain reaction (PCR)
 Stefan Mundlos (born 1958), German geneticist, discovered genes responsible for skeletal development, and particularly effects of gene expression induced by abnormal gene position in a topologically associating domain

N 
Walter E. Nance (born 1933), US internist and geneticist, research on twins and genetics of deafness
Daniel Nathans (1928–1999), US microbiologist, Nobel Prize for restriction endonucleases
James V. Neel (1915–2000), distinguished human geneticist, founded first genetics clinic in the US
Fred Neidhardt, US microbiologist, pioneer in molecular physiology and proteomics of E. coli
Oliver Nelson (1920–2001), US maize geneticist, profound impact on agriculture and basic genetics
Walter Nelson-Rees (1929–2009), US cytogeneticist, confirmed HeLa cells contamination of other cell lines
Eugene W. Nester, US microbial geneticist, genetics of Agrobacterium (crown gall formation)
Carl Neuberg (1877–1956), early pioneer of the study of metabolism.
Hans Neurath (1909–2002), Austrian-US protein chemist, helped set stage for proteomics
Marshall W. Nirenberg (1927–2010), US geneticist, biochemist and Nobel Prize-winner
Eva Nogales, Spanish biophysicist studying eukaryotic transcription and translation initiation complexes
Edward Novitski (1918–2006), eminent US Drosophila geneticist, pioneer in chromosome mechanics
Paul Nurse (born 1949), UK biochemist, Nobel Prize for work on  CDK, a key regulator of the cell cycle
Christiane Nüsslein-Volhard (born 1942), German developmental biologist and Nobel Prize-winner
William Nyhan (born 1926), US pediatrician and biochemical geneticist, described Lesch–Nyhan syndrome

O 
Severo Ochoa (1905–1993), Spanish-American biochemist, Nobel Prize for work on the synthesis of RNA
Susumu Ohno (1928–2000), Japanese-US biologist, evolutionary cytogenetics and molecular evolution
Tomoko Ohta (born 1933), Japanese scientist in molecular evolution, the nearly neutral theory of evolution
Pete Oliver (1898–1991), US geneticist, switched from Drosophila to human genetics
Olufunmilayo Olopade (born 1957), oncologist known for research on genetics of breast cancer and health disparities 
Jane M. Olson (1952–2004), US genetic epidemiologist and biostatistician
Maynard Olson (born 1943), US geneticist, pioneered map of yeast genome and Human Genome Project
John Opitz (born 1935), German-American medical geneticist, expert on dysmorphology and syndromes
Harry Ostrer, US medical geneticist, studies origins of Jewish peoples
Ray Owen (1915–2014), US geneticist, immunologist, found cattle blood groups and chimeric twin calves

P 
Svante Pääbo (born 1955), Swedish molecular anthropologist in Leipzig studying Neanderthal genome
David Page (born 1956), US physician and geneticist who mapped, cloned and sequenced the human Y chromosome
Theophilus Painter (1889–1969), US zoologist, studied fruit fly and human testis chromosomes
Arthur Pardee (1921–2019), US scientist who discovered restriction point in the cell cycle
Klaus Patau (1908–1975), German-American cytogeneticist, described trisomy 13
John Thomas Patterson (1878–1960), American embryologist and geneticist who studied isolating mechanisms
Andrew H. Paterson, US geneticist, research leader in plant genomics
Linus Pauling (1901–1994), eminent US chemist, won Nobel Prizes for chemical bonds and peace
Crodowaldo Pavan (1919–2009), Brazilian biologist, fly geneticist, and influential scientist in Brazil
Rose Payne (1909–1999), US transplant geneticist, key to discovery and development of HLA system
Raymond Pearl (1879–1940), US biologist, biostatistician, rejected eugenics
Karl Pearson (1857–1936), British statistician, made key contributions to genetic analysis
Caroline Pellew (1882–?), British geneticist
LS Penrose (1898–1972), British psychiatrist, human geneticist, pioneered genetics of mental retardation
Max Perutz (1914–2002), Austrian-British molecular biologist, Nobel Prize for structure of hemoglobin
Massimo Pigliucci (born 1964), Italian-US plant ecological and evolutionary geneticist. Winner of the Dobzhansky Prize.
Alfred Ploetz (1860–1940), German physician, biologist, eugenicist, introduced racial hygiene to Germany
Paul Polani (1914–2006), Trieste-born UK pediatrician, major catalyst of medical genetics in Britain
Charles Pomerat (1905–1951), US cell biologist, pioneered the field of tissue culture
Guido Pontecorvo (1907–1999), Italian-born Scottish geneticist and pioneer molecular biologist
Alkes Price, American geneticist known for statistical methods to draw inference from genetic data, including genomic ancestry quantification and heritability estimation 
George R. Price (1922–1975), brilliant but troubled US population geneticist and theoretical biologist
Peter Propping (1942–2016), German human geneticist, studies of epilepsy
Mark Ptashne (born 1940), US molecular biologist, studies of genetic switch, phage lambda
Ted Puck (1916–2005), US physicist, work in mammalian and human cell culture, genetics, cytogenetics
RC Punnett (1875–1967), early English geneticist, discovered linkage with William Bateson, stimulated G. H. Hardy
Shaun Purcell, psychiatric geneticist who developed the PLINK genetic program

Q 
Lluis Quintana-Murci (born 1970), French-Spanish human population geneticist, human evolutionary genetics, evolution of immunity

R 
Michèle Ramsay, South African geneticist, single-gene disorders, epigenetics, complex diseases 
Robert Race (1907–1984), British expert on blood groups, along with wife Ruth Sanger
Sheldon C. Reed (1910–2003), US pioneer in genetic counseling and behavioral genetics
G. N. Ramachandran (1922–2001) Indian biophysicist, co-discovered triple-helix structure of collagen
David Reich (born 1974), US, human population genetics and genomics, did humans and chimps interbreed?
Theodore Reich (1938–2003), Canadian-US psychiatrist, a founder of modern psychiatric genetics
Alexander Rich (1925–2015), US biologist, biophysicist, discovered Z-DNA and tRNA 3-dimensional structure
Rollin C. Richmond, US, evolutionary and pharmacogenetic studies of Drosophila, university administrator
Neil Risch, US human and population geneticist, studied torsion dystonia
Otto Renner (1883–1960), German plant geneticist, established maternal plastid inheritance
Marcus Rhoades (1903–1991), great maize (corn) geneticist and cytogeneticist
David L. Rimoin (1936–2012), Canadian–US medical geneticist, studied skeletal dysplasias
Richard Roberts (born 1943), British molecular biologist, Nobel Prize for introns and gene-splicing
Arthur Robinson (1914–2000), US pediatrician, geneticist, pioneer on sex chromosome anomalies
Herschel L. Roman (1914–1989), US geneticist, innovated in analysis in maize and budding yeast
Irwin Rose (1926–2015), US biologist, Nobel Prize for ubiquitin-mediated protein degradation
Leon Rosenberg (1933–2022), US physician-geneticist, molecular basis of inherited metabolic disease
David S Rosenblatt, Canadian geneticist
Peyton Rous (1879–1970), US tumor virologist and tissue culture expert, Nobel Prize
Janet Rowley (1925–2013), US cancer cytogeneticist who found Ph chromosome due to translocation
Peter T. Rowley (1929–2006), US internist and geneticist, genetics of cancer and leukemia
Frank Ruddle (1929–2013), US biologist, somatic cell genetics, human gene mapping, paved way for transgenic mice
Ernst Rüdin (1874–1952), Swiss psychiatrist, geneticist and eugenicist who promoted racial hygiene
Elizabeth S. Russell (1913–2001), US mammalian geneticist, pioneering work on pigmentation, blood-forming cells, and germ cells
Liane B. Russell (1923–2019), Austrian-born US mouse geneticist and radiation biologist
William L. Russell (1910–2003), UK-US mouse geneticist, pioneered study of mutagenesis in mice

S 
Leo Sachs (1924–2013), German-Israeli molecular cancer biologist, colony-stimulating factors, interleukins
Ruth Sager (1918–1997), US geneticist, pioneer of cytoplasmic genetics, tumor suppressor genes
Joseph Sambrook (1939–2019), British viral geneticist
Avery A. Sandberg (1921–2016), US internist, discovered XYY in 1961, expert on chromosomes in cancer
Lodewijk A. Sandkuijl (1953–2002), Dutch expert on genetic epidemiology and statistical genetics
Larry Sandler (1929–1987), US Drosophila geneticist, chromosome mechanics, devoted teacher
John C. Sanford (born 1950), US horticultural geneticist and intelligent design advocate
Fred Sanger (1918–2013), UK biochemist, two Nobel Prizes, sequence of insulin, DNA sequencing method
Ruth Sanger (1918–2001), Australian expert on blood groups, along with husband Robert Race
Karl Sax (1892–1973), US botanist and cytogeneticist, effects of radiation on chromosomes
Paul Schedl (born 1947), US molecular biologist, genetic regulation of developmental pathways in fruit fly
Albert Schinzel (born 1944), Austrian human geneticist, clinical genetics, karyotype-phenotype correlations
Werner Schmid (1930–2002), Swiss pioneer in human cytogenetics, described cat eye syndrome
Gertrud Schüpbach (born 1950), Swiss-US biologist, molecular and genetic mechanisms in oogenesis
Charles Scriver (born 1930), Canadian pediatrician, biochemical geneticist, newborn metabolic screening
Ernie Sears (1910–1991), Wheat Geneticist who pioneered methods of transferring desirable genes from wild relatives to cultivated wheat in order to increase wheat's resistance to various insects and diseases
Jay Seegmiller (1920–2006), US human biochemical geneticist, found cause of Lesch–Nyhan syndrome
Fred Sherman (1932–2013), US geneticist, one of the "fathers" and mentors of modern yeast genetics
Pak Sham, geneticist known for his work in psychiatric genomics 
Larry Shapiro, US pediatric geneticist, lysosomal storage disorders, X chromosome inactivation
Lucy Shapiro (born 1940), US molecular geneticist, gene expression during the cell cycle, bacterium Caulobacter
Phillip Sharp (born 1944), US geneticist and molecular biologist, Nobel Prize for co-discovery of gene splicing
Philip Sheppard (1921–1976), UK population geneticist, lepidopterist, human blood group researcher
G. H. Shull (1874–1954), US geneticist, made key discoveries including heterosis
Torsten Sjögren
Mark Skolnick (born 1946), US geneticist, developed Restriction Fragment Length Polymorphisms (RFLPs) for genetic mapping, and founded Myriad Genetics
Obaid Siddiqi (1932–2013), Indian neurogeneticist, pioneer on  olfactory sense of fruit fly Drosophila
David Sillence (born 1944), Australian clinical geneticist, pioneered training of Australian geneticists, research in bone dysplasias, classified osteogenesis imperfecta
Norman Simmons (1915–2004), US, forgotten donor of pure DNA to Rosalind Franklin in double helix saga
Piotr Słonimski (1922–2009), Polish-Parisian yeast geneticist, pioneer of mitochondrial heredity
William S. Sly (born 1932), US biochemical geneticist, mucopolysaccharidosis type VII (Sly syndrome)
Cedric A. B. Smith (1917–2002), British statistician, made key contributions to statistical genetics
David W. Smith (1926–1981), US pediatrician, influential dysmorphologist, named fetal alcohol syndrome
Hamilton Smith (born 1931), US microbiologist, Nobel Prize for restriction endonucleases
Michael Smith (1932–2000), UK-born Canadian biochemist, Nobel Prize for site-directed mutagenesis
Oliver Smithies (1925–2017), UK/US molecular geneticist, inventor, gel electrophoresis, knockout mice
George Snell (1903–1996), US mouse geneticist, pioneer transplant immunologist, won Nobel Prize
Lawrence H. Snyder (1901–1986), US pioneer in medical genetics, studied blood groups
Robert R. Sokal (1925–2012), Austrian-born US biological anthropologist and biostatistician.
Tracy M. Sonneborn (1905–1981), protozoan biologist and geneticist
Ed Southern (born 1938), UK molecular biologist, invented Southern blot and DNA microarray technologies
Hans Spemann (1869–1941)  German embryologist, Nobel Prize for discovery of embryonic induction
David Stadler, US geneticist, mechanisms of mutation and recombination in Neurospora
L. J. Stadler (1896–1954), eminent Us maize geneticist, father of David Stadler
Frank Stahl (born 1929), US molecular biologist, the Stahl half of the Meselson-Stahl experiment
David States, US geneticist and bioinformatician, computational study of human genome and proteome
G. Ledyard Stebbins (1906–2000), US botanist, geneticist and evolutionary biologist
Michael Stebbins, US geneticist, science writer, editor and activist
Emmy Stein (1879–1954), German botanist and geneticist
Joan A. Steitz (born 1941), US molecular biologist, pioneering studies of snRNAs and snRNPs (snurps)
Gunther Stent (1924–2008), German-born US molecular geneticist, phage worker, philosopher of science
Curt Stern (1902–1981), German-born US Drosophila and human geneticist, great teacher
Nettie Stevens (1861–1912), US geneticist, studied chromosomal basis of sex and discovered XY basis
Miodrag Stojković (born 1964), Serbian geneticist, working in Europe on mammalian cloning
George Streisinger (1927–1984), US geneticist, work on bacterial viruses, frameshift mutations
Leonell Strong (1894–1982), US geneticist, mouse geneticist and cancer researcher
Alfred Sturtevant (1891–1970), constructed first genetic map of a chromosome
John Sulston (1942–2018), UK molecular biologist, Nobel Prize for programmed cell death in C. elegans
James B. Sumner (1887–1955), US biochemist, Nobel Prize, found enzymes can be crystallized
Maurice Super (1936–2006), South African-born UK pediatric geneticist, studied cystic fibrosis
Andrea Superti-Furga (born 1959), Swiss and Italian paediatrician and geneticist, studied disorder of connective tissue, skeletal dysplasias and malformation syndromes
Grant Sutherland (born 1945), Australian molecular cytogeneticist, pioneer on human fragile sites, human genome
Walter Sutton (1877–1916), US surgeon and scientist, proved chromosomes contained genes
David Suzuki (born 1936), Canadian Drosophila geneticist, science broadcaster and environmental activist
M. S. Swaminathan (born 1925), Indian agricultural scientist, geneticist, leader of Green Revolution in India
Bryan Sykes (1947–2020), British human geneticist, discovered ways to extract DNA from fossilized bones
Jack Szostak (born 1952), Anglo-US geneticist, worked on recombination, artificial chromosomes, and on telomeres. He has been awarded a Nobel Prize for its work on telomeres.

T 
Jantina Tammes (1871–1947), Dutch geneticist, one of the first Dutch scientists to report on variability and evolution
Edward Tatum (1909–1975), showed genes control individual steps in metabolism
Joyce Taylor-Papadimitriou (born 1932), British molecular biologist and geneticist
Howard Temin (1934–1994), US geneticist, Nobel Prize for discovery of reverse transcriptase
Alan Templeton (born c. 1948), US geneticist and biostatistician, molecular evolution, evolutionary biology
Joseph R. Testa (born 1947), US cancer geneticist and malignant mesothelioma biologist whose team cloned AKT genes and co-discovered the BAP1 tumor predisposition syndrome 
Eeva Therman (1916–2004), Finnish-born US geneticist who helped characterize and find the molecular basis for trisomy 13 and trisomy 18
Donnall Thomas (1920–2012), US physician, Nobel Prize for bone marrow transplantation for leukemia
Nikolay Timofeev-Ressovsky (1900–1981), Russian radiation and evolution geneticist
Alfred Tissières (1917–2003), Swiss molecular geneticist who pioneered molecular biology in Geneva
Joe Hin Tjio (1919–2001), Java-born geneticist who first discovered humans have 46 chromosomes
Susumu Tonegawa (born 1939), Japanese molecular biologist; Nobel Prize for genetics of antibody diversity
Erich von Tschermak (1871–1962), Austrian agronomist and one of the re-discoverers of Mendel's laws
Lap-chee Tsui (born 1950), Chinese geneticist who sequenced first human gene (for cystic fibrosis) with Francis Collins
Elena Jane Tucker, Australian geneticist investigating mitochondrial disease
Raymond Turpin (1895–1988), French pediatrician, geneticist, Lejeune's co-discoverer of trisomy 21

U 
Axel Ullrich (born 1943), German molecular biologist, signal transduction, discovered oncogene, Herceptin
Irene Ayako Uchida (1917–2013), one of the first Canadian geneticists and cytogeneticists. Down syndrome

V 
Harold Varmus (born 1939), US Nobel Prize-winner for oncogenes, head of NIH
Rajeev Kumar Varshney (born 1973), Indian geneticist, principal scientist at ICRISAT and theme leader at Generation Challenge Programme
Nikolai Vavilov (1887–1943), eminent Russian botanist and geneticist, anti-Lysenko, died in prison
Craig Venter (born 1946), US molecular biologist and entrepreneur, raced to sequence the genome
Jerome Vinograd (1913–1976), US, leader in biochemistry and molecular biology of nucleic acids
Peter Visscher, Dutch Australian geneticist who works on the genetic architecture of complex traits
Friedrich Vogel (1925–2006), German, leader in human genetics, coined term "pharmacogenetics"
Bert Vogelstein (born 1949), US pediatrician and cancer geneticist, series of mutations in colorectal cancer
Erik Adolf von Willebrand (1870–1949), Finnish internist who found commonest bleeding disorder

W 
Petrus Johannes Waardenburg (1886–1979), Dutch ophthalmologist, geneticist, Waardenburg syndrome
C. H. Waddington (1905–1975), British developmental biologist, paleontologist, geneticist, embryologist
Alfred Russel Wallace (1823–1913), Welsh, proposed natural selection theory independent of Darwin
Douglas C. Wallace (born 1946), US mitochondrial geneticist, pioneered the use of human mtDNA as a molecular marker
Peter Walter (born 1954), German-US molecular biologist studying protein folding and protein targeting
Richard H. Ward (1943–2003), English-born New Zealand human and anthropological geneticist
James D. Watson (born 1928), US molecular geneticist, Nobel Prize for discovery of the double helix
David Weatherall (1933–2018), distinguished UK physician, geneticist, pioneer in hemoglobin and molecular medicine
Robert Weinberg (born 1942), US, discovered first human oncogene and first tumor suppressor gene
Wilhelm Weinberg (1862–1937), German physician, formulated basic law of population genetics
Spencer Wells (born 1969), US genetic anthropologist, head of Genographic Project to map past migrations
Susan R. Wessler (born 1953), US plant molecular geneticist, transposable elements re genetic diversity
Raymond L. White (1943–2018), US cancer geneticist, cloned APC colon cancer gene and neurofibromatosis gene
Glayde Whitney (1939–2002), US behavioral geneticist, accused of supporting scientific racism
Reed Wickner (born c. 1942), US molecular geneticist, yeast phenotypes due to prion forms of native proteins
Alexander S. Wiener (1907–1976), U.S. immunologist, discovered  Rh blood groups with Landsteiner
Eric F. Wieschaus (born 1947), US developmental biologist and Nobel Prize-winner
Maurice Wilkins (1916–2004), New Zealand-born British Nobel Prize-winner with Watson and Crick
Huntington Willard (born c. 1953), US human geneticist, X chromosome inactivation, gene silencing
Harold G. Williams (born 1929), US, Oklahoma cattle geneticist pioneer
Robley Williams (1908–1995), US virologist, recreated tobacco mosaic virus from its RNA + protein coat
Ian Wilmut (born 1944), UK reproductive biologist who first cloned a mammal (lamb named Dolly)
Allan Wilson (1934–1991), New Zealand-US innovator in molecular study of human evolution
David Sloan Wilson (born 1949), US evolutionary biologist and geneticist
Edmund Beecher Wilson (1856–1939), US zoologist, geneticist, discovered XY and XX sex chromosomes
Øjvind Winge (1886–1964), Danish biologist and pioneer in yeast genetics
Chester B. Whitley (born 1950), US geneticist, pioneered treatment of lysosomal diseases
Carl Woese (1928–2012), US biologist, defined Archaea as new domain of life, rRNA phylogenetic tool
Ulrich Wolf (1933–2017), German cytogeneticist, found chromosome 4p deletion in Wolf–Hirschhorn syndrome
Melaku Worede (born 1936), Ethiopian conservationist and geneticist
Naomi Wray, Australian geneticist known for her work on genetics of complex traits
Sewall Wright (1889–1988), eminent US geneticist who, with Ronald Fisher, united genetics & evolution

Y 
Jian Yang, Chinese geneticist, known for his work on the missing heritability of complex traits
Charles Yanofsky (1925–2018), US molecular geneticist, colinearity of gene and its protein product

Z 
Floyd Zaiger (1926–2020), fruit geneticist and entrepreneur
Hans Zellweger (1909–1990) Swiss-US pediatrician and clinical geneticist, described Zellweger syndrome
Norton Zinder (1928–2012), US biologist and phage worker who discovered genetic transduction
Rolf M. Zinkernagel (born 1944), Swiss scientist, won Nobel Prize for immune recognition of antigen

Fictional geneticists
Curt Connors in the Spider-Man comics
Moira MacTaggert in the X-Men comics
Andrew Wells in the television series Buffy the Vampire Slayer
Dr. Henry Wu in the movie Jurassic World

See also
 List of biochemists

Lists of biologists

 
G